Zbyněk Hráček (born 9 September 1970) is a Czech chess grandmaster. He was Czech Chess Champion in 1994, won the Zonal tournament Odorhea 1995 and the tournaments Pardubice (Open) 1993, Altensteig 1995 and Lippstadt 2000.

Career 
Hráček played for Czechoslovakia at the Chess Olympiads of 1990 and 1992, and for the Czech Republic at the Olympiads of 1994, 1996, 2000, 2002, 2004, 2006, 2008, 2010, 2012, and 2014 and in the European Team Chess Championships of 1997, 1999, 2003, 2005 and 2007.

In 1996 (January - June list), Hracek was in the Elo Top Twenty of the world and the leading Czech player. In the November 2009 FIDE list, he has an Elo rating of 2624, making him the Czech Republic's number three.

References

External links

Zbyněk Hráček at 365Chess.com
Photo on Czech Chess Federation Web site

1970 births
Living people
People from Uherské Hradiště
Chess grandmasters
Czech chess players